Makowski (feminine: Makowska; plural: Makowscy) is a Polish surname with regional variations across Slavic countries, such as Makovsky in Russia.

Etymology
The surname Makowski relates to a location, as it was common among nobility (the suffix -ski being the equivalent of the English "of", the Germanic "von" and the French "de"). In this case, it is likely indicating one of the towns named Maków or Makowo.

The etymological root "Mak" translates to "Poppy" in Slavic languages.

Related surnames

Coat of Arms
The "Polish Armorial" reference by the heraldist Kasper Niesiecki lists several noble (szlachta) people with the name Makowski belonging to different heraldic clans (herb), including:

 Makowski: Niesiecki mentions the captain of the cavalry Tomasz Makowski, ennobled in 1662.
 Jelita
 Gryf and Ogończyk

People

Arts 
 The Russified Polish members of the Makovsky artist family, including:
Egor Makovsky (1802-1866), amateur painter and accountant, father of:
Alexandra Makovskaya (1837–1915), Russian landscape painter
Konstantin Makovsky (1839–1915), Russian history and portrait painter, father of:
Sergey Makovsky (1877–1962), Russian poet, art critic, and organizer of art expositions
Elena Luksch-Makovskaya (1878-1967), Russian painter and sculptor
Nikolay Makovsky (1842–1886), Russian genre painter 
Vladimir Makovsky (1846–1920), Russian genre painter and art collector, father of:
Aleksandr Makovsky (1869–1924), Russian painter
 Tadeusz Makowski (1882–1932), Polish painter
 Helena Makowska (1893–1964), Polish actress
 Zbigniew Makowski (1930–2019), Polish painter

Academia 
 Jan Makowski  (1588-1644), Polish philologist
   (?-1683), Polish theologist
 Johann Makowsky (born 1948), Hungarian mathematician
 Liza Makowski, American scientist

Military 
   (1914-1944), Polish member of the French Resistance

Politics 
 Stanley Makowski (1923–1981), American politician
 Andrzej Gąsienica-Makowski (born 1952), Polish politician

Sports 
 Grażyna Staszak-Makowska (born 1953), Polish fencer
 Greg Makowski (born 1956), American soccer player
 Maria Makowska (born 1969), Polish footballer

Others 
  (1575-1630), Polish cartograph
 Tomasz Makowski (librarian) (born 1970), Polish librarian
 Michael Makowski (born 1983), Australian entrepreneur and television personality

See also

References

Polish-language surnames